Anderson Patrick Bjork (born August 5, 1996) is an American professional ice hockey left winger for the  Chicago Blackhawks of the National Hockey League (NHL). Bjork was selected 146th overall by the Boston Bruins in the 2014 NHL Entry Draft.

Playing career
Bjork played college hockey at Notre Dame in the Hockey East from 2014 to 2017. In 2016–17, Bjork was a finalist for the Hobey Baker Award, marking him as one of the ten best players in men's college hockey; he was also named a Hockey East First-Team All-Star, and was a co-winner of the Hockey East Three-Stars Award.

At the completion of his junior season with the Fighting Irish, Bjork concluded his collegiate career in signing a three-year, entry-level contract with the Boston Bruins on May 30, 2017.

Bjork's NHL career started with the 2017–18 Bruins season opener, a 4–3 home ice victory over the Nashville Predators, when he scored an assist on fellow Bruins rookie Jake DeBrusk's first-ever NHL goal, for his first point as an NHL player. Bjork's first NHL goal came in the fourth game of the season on the road against the Arizona Coyotes, as the final goal of a 6–2 road win for the Bruins.

On January 30, 2018, during a home-ice game against the visiting Anaheim Ducks, Bjork suffered a season-ending left shoulder injury – he underwent a successful arthroscopy and labral repair three weeks later, and was expected to take six months to fully heal from the surgical repair.

In the pandemic delayed 2020–21 season, Bjork collected 2 goals and 5 points through 30 regular season games before he was dealt by the Bruins on the eve of the trade deadline along with a 2021 second-round draft pick to the Buffalo Sabres in exchange for Taylor Hall and Curtis Lazar on April 11, 2021.

In the final year of his contract, on March 2, 2023, on the eve of that season's trade deadline, Bjork was traded to the Chicago Blackhawks in exchange for future considerations. At the time of the trade, Bjork had spent the entire season with Buffalo's AHL affiliate, the Rochester Americans, save for one game with the Sabres on November 16, 2022.

Personal life
Before Notre Dame, Bjork went to high school at Pioneer High School in Ann Arbor, when he moved there to play for the USA Hockey National Team Development Program. Bjork's family includes several Notre Dame alumni. His parents, Kirt and Patricia, both of whom are of Swedish descent, his sisters Brinya and Keali, and cousin Erik Condra all attended the school. Kirt Bjork also played hockey for Notre Dame. During college Anders was enrolled in the Mendoza College of Business. He has a younger brother, Brady, who has committed to play hockey at University of Notre Dame.

Career statistics

Regular season and playoffs

International

Awards and honors

References

External links
 

1996 births
Living people
AHCA Division I men's ice hockey All-Americans
American people of Swedish descent
American men's ice hockey left wingers
Boston Bruins draft picks
Boston Bruins players
Buffalo Sabres players
Chicago Blackhawks players
Ice hockey players from Wisconsin
Notre Dame Fighting Irish men's ice hockey players
People from Mequon, Wisconsin
Providence Bruins players
Rochester Americans players
USA Hockey National Team Development Program players